Sleep is an American heavy metal band from San Jose, California. Guitarist Matt Pike and bassist and vocalist Al Cisneros have been the only constant members throughout its history, with several changes of drummers throughout their history. Critic Eduardo Rivadavia describes them as "perhaps the ultimate stoner rock band" and notes they exerted a strong influence on metal in the 1990s. The band first gained attention with their second album, Sleep's Holy Mountain (1992). However, conflict with the band's record company contributed to Sleep's breakup by the end of the decade. Sleep's third album, Dopesmoker, was released after the band's dissolution. The band reformed in 2009 and has played sporadic live dates internationally since. In 2018, Sleep surprise-released their comeback album, The Sciences, on Third Man Records, to critical acclaim.

History

Early years
Sleep evolved in the early 1990s from the band Asbestosdeath, which was established by vocalist/bassist Al Cisneros, drummer Chris Hakius, and guitarist Tom Choi. Asbestosdeath expanded to a quartet with the introduction of Matt Pike on guitar, and recorded two singles - "Dejection" for Profane Existence and the self-released "Unclean". Choi departed, and later founded Operator Generator, It Is I, Noothgrush, and Las Vegas' Black Jetts. Asbestosdeath recruited Justin Marler as replacement and the band adopted the new name, Sleep.

Recording era
Their debut album Volume One was released in 1991. Frequently compared to bands like Saint Vitus, Sleep soon gained a devoted fanbase within the developing doom metal scene. Marler quit the band soon after to take up life as a monk, leaving the band as a power trio for the recording of their Volume Two EP, which was released officially by Off the Disk Records in 1991.

The band's next album was sent to the independent label Earache as a demo. Recorded at Razors Edge studios in San Francisco, with Billy Anderson as engineer, the tape showcased Sleep's love of all things retro, from the blatant Black Sabbath/Blue Cheer influences, to their fixation with 1970's-style tube amplification. The label immediately signed the band and released the tape exactly as it was received.

Sleep's Holy Mountain (1992) is widely considered the seminal album in the evolution of stoner metal. The album's release was followed by a potentially lucrative offer from London Records, and Sleep signed with them. Around this time, Earache released its first Black Sabbath tribute album, and Sleep contributed a cover of "Snowblind".

Under their new contract, Sleep began work on its third album, Dopesmoker, in 1995. Much to the dismay of executives at London Records, Dopesmoker was a single song, over an hour long. London Records declared the album unmarketable and refused to release it. The label had it remixed and cut up into sections by David Sardy, which led to a deadlock due to the band being unhappy with the result. Frustrated and generally unhappy with the situation, the members of Sleep decided to disband.

After Sleep
In 1998, Sleep released Jerusalem as an "official bootleg". One year later, Jerusalem was given an official legitimate release by The Music Cartel in the US and Rise Above Records in Europe.

Finally, in 2003 the original version of Dopesmoker was officially released by Tee Pee Records. It is generally considered the definitive version of the album. An excerpted version can be heard on Jim Jarmusch's Broken Flowers original soundtrack.

Cisneros and Hakius later formed the doom metal band Om while Pike formed sludge metal band High on Fire.

In 2007 a CD compilation of both 7-inch releases of the pre-Sleep band Asbestosdeath was released on Southern Lord Records.

Reunion and The Sciences
In May 2009, Sleep reformed to perform two exclusive reunion sets in Britain as part of the All Tomorrow's Parties music festival. During these shows, the band performed an unheard song that had been written during the Dopesmoker recording sessions, titled "Antarcticans Thawed," for the first time.

After the band's initial reunion performance, original drummer Chris Hakius decided to retire from music to raise a family, and he was replaced on drums by Jason Roeder of experimental metal band Neurosis. The reconfigured lineup played the ATP New York 2010 music festival in Monticello, New York, where it performed Holy Mountain in its entirety. The band followed up this performance with a tour of the rest of the United States, playing headlining dates and festivals, through September.

From 2010 onward, Sleep performed similar sporadic festival and touring engagements when the members' otherwise busy touring schedules permitted. In late 2012, in conjunction with an upcoming appearance at Maryland Deathfest, the band stated that it considers Sleep to be a "full, reunited band."  In 2014, Al Cisneros announced in an interview that the band was working on a new record. On July 21, 2014, a new song titled "The Clarity" was released via Adult Swim Singles.

In November 2017 the band members posted a message in Morse code stating that they had almost finished recording material for a new album. On April 19, 2018, the band announced The Sciences, their first album in nearly 20 years, to be released the next day on Third Man Records. The release of The Sciences was a surprise, being released the day after it was announced, and created a lot of excitement within their fanbase. The album's release date, April 20, 2018, was also Record Store Day weekend. Third Man Records released a limited edition split-colored vinyl with an alternate cover to be sold at a limited number of record stores in the US on the release date. The album was met with critical acclaim. Pitchfork wrote in their review, "[The Sciences] makes everything that was originally great about Sleep even better." Spin declared that the record gives "stoner-metal acolytes a bonafide miracle."

On May 23, 2018, Sleep released a new song titled "Leagues Beneath" through Adult Swim Singles and Third Man Records.

On November 11, 2019, the band announced an indefinite hiatus.

In early 2022, the band announced a return to live shows.

Style
Musically, Sleep's sound has been characterized as stoner rock built upon slow, down-tuned bass playing alongside similarly low guitar riffs. Repetition is frequently employed, working to create a "hypnotic state" supplemented by Al Cisneros' vocals.

Sleep has used cannabis-influenced imagery since the release of their second album, often delivered in a "quasi-religious" manner. In an interview about the making of Dopesmoker, Matt Pike acknowledged that the band spent "a lot" of their label advance on cannabis, and "a lot of time." Pike also said that about $75,000 was spent on customized amplifiers so the album would have numerous tone layers. He said the songwriting process for Dopesmoker was long, with the band "working on [the song] for like four years." Al Cisneros stated that smoking cannabis was vital to the song's creative process: "I was really dependent on the space I got into when I was using it [...] The line, 'Drop out of life [with bong in hand],' was kind of a creed at that point."

Their record The Sciences makes multiple allusions to Black Sabbath, whose sound heavily inspired Sleep. Tony Iommi is referenced in the lyrics of "Marijuanaut's Theme", and the song "Giza Butler" is a play on the city Giza and the name of Black Sabbath's bassist, Geezer Butler. Also in "Giza Butler", references are made to several things in Frank Herbert's 1965 novel Dune, including the gom jabbar (referred to as the "bong jabbar") and Muad'Dib (as "Muad'Doob").

Members
Current lineup
 Al Cisneros – bass, vocals, waterpipe (1990–1998, 2009–2019, 2022–present)
 Matt Pike – guitars (1990–1998, 2009–2019, 2022–present)
 Jason Roeder – drums (2010–2019, 2022-present)

Former members
 Chris Hakius – drums (1990–1998, two performances in 2009)
 Justin Marler – guitars (1990–1991)

Timeline

Discography

Albums
Note: The band's album Dopesmoker (2003) was originally released as Jerusalem in 1999 by The Music Cartel. This release was unauthorized by the band who discredit the validity of its quality and release.
 Volume One (1991) Tupelo Recording Company
 Sleep's Holy Mountain (1992) Earache Records
 Jerusalem and Dopesmoker (1999) The Music Cartel; (2003) Tee Pee Records; (2012) Southern Lord Records; (2022) Third Man Records
 The Sciences (2018) Third Man Records

EPs
 Volume Two (1992) Off the Disk Records
 Iommic Life (2021) Third Man Records 
Released on 4/20/21, contains the remixed version of the single "The Clarity" and the single "Leagues Beneath."

Non-album tracks
 "Snowblind" (Black Sabbath cover) on Masters of Misery (1992) Earache Records
 "Dopesmoker (abridged version)" on Music from Broken Flowers (2005) Decca Records
 "The Clarity" on Adult Swim Singles Program 2014 (2014) Williams Street Records
 "Leagues Beneath" on Adult Swim Singles Program 2017 (2018) Williams Street Records/Third Man Records

Music videos
 Dragonaut (1993) Earache Records

References

Bibliography

External links

American doom metal musical groups
American stoner rock musical groups
Cannabis culture
Heavy metal musical groups from California
Musical groups from San Jose, California
1990 establishments in California
1998 disestablishments in California
Musical groups established in 1990
Musical groups disestablished in 1998
Musical groups reestablished in 2009
Earache Records artists
Southern Lord Records artists
American musical trios
Third Man Records artists
Musical groups reestablished in 2022